St. Werburgh's Church, Spondon, is a parish church in the Inclusive Anglo-Catholic tradition of the Church of England located in Spondon, Derbyshire.

History

The present church dates from around 1390, when it replaced an earlier church destroyed by fire in 1340. It was re-listed as Grade II in 2012.

The main body of the church, both nave and chancel, along with the 35 metre high tower and spire, date to 1390, although the north wall of the nave was damaged by subsidence and was rebuilt in 1826.

The church was restored in 1892 which removed many of the changes made in 1826. The flat roof of 1826 was replaced with a pitched roof, and other roofs were raised in height. The north aisle was rebuilt and the exterior wall was moved out by 5 ft. Plaster from the walls and the pillars was removed, to reveal the original stonework. The arch under the tower was opened up, and the galleries were removed. The architect was John Oldrid Scott of London, and the contractor was Rudd of Grantham.

There have been recent extensive renovations to the tower and spire funded partly through Heritage Lottery funding.  An ongoing project will restore the floor of the nave, improve welcome facilities and reorder the sanctuary adding permanent nave altar in front to the choir stalls on an extended nave altar platform.

Previous incumbents include Canon Richard Andrews, who now serves as Canon Precentor of Derby Cathedral, and the Very Reverend Geoffrey Marshall who went on to become Dean of Brecon in the Church in Wales.  The Reverend TEM Barber was vicar from March 1939 until May 1986 and is known to have been the longest serving vicar in the Church of England at that time, and also the longest-ever serving vicar of Spondon.

During his time as vicar, the church congregations flourished. He taught strictly from the Book of Common Prayer with High Church ritual, and was renowned for his work with the sick and dying, and for his work with young people. One of his greatest works was with the Spondon Church Boys' Club, which he founded in 1939 and ran until his death in 1988. A feature of the club was the annual summer camp to various venues, but latterly to Sidmouth. Following his resignation due to ill health at the age of 79 he was, thanks to his many friends,  able to continue to run Spondon Church Boys' Club until his death two years later. His funeral was packed by his parishioners, past and present, whom he had served for 50 years.

Features

Adjacent to the main altar is a recessed sedilia, nearby a priest's sanctus window and there are four piscinas within the church.

There is a First World War memorial located in the Lady Chapel and a newer Tower Chapel.  The royal arms displayed over the north door is dated between 1702 and 1707 because it displays the arms of Queen Anne before the union with Scotland.

Externally can be found the remains of a decorated cross shaft said to date to around 870, though it was not originally located in the churchyard.

In the nearby former vicarage grounds is what is considered to be a holy well.

Bells

There is a peal of six bells, one of which is 16th century, one 17th, and the remaining four of the 19th century.

Organ

A new organ was installed and opened by W.E. Gover of St Werburgh's Church, Derby on 21 April 1839.

The organ by the builder James Jepson Binns was opened on 14 June 1905 and has a case by John Oldrid Scott. The total cost was £1,100. The electric action was fitted by M.C. Thompson in 1989. A specification of the organ can be found on the National Pipe Organ Register.

See also
Listed buildings in Spondon

References

Saint Werburgh
Church of England church buildings in Derbyshire
Grade II listed churches in Derbyshire
Anglo-Catholic church buildings in Derbyshire
Churches completed in 1390
14th-century church buildings in England